Siddhipasha Union is a union parishad of Abhaynagar Upazila,  in Jessore District, Khulna Division of Bangladesh.

References

Unions of Abhaynagar Upazila
Unions of Jessore District
Unions of Khulna Division